Lobster Cave is a cave on Liuqiu Island, off Pingtung County, Taiwan.

Name
"Lobster Cave" is a calque of the cave's Chinese name. It supposedly derives from lobsters who lived there over a century ago that were driven out by the island's residents during a night raid.

Geology
The cave is limestone and coral, surrounded by coral reefs, potholes, and gullies. It is accessible at low tide.

See also
 Geology of Taiwan
 Black Dwarf & Beauty Caves

References

Citations

Bibliography

 .

Caves of Taiwan
Landforms of Pingtung County